The Royal Palace or Dar al-Makhzen is the primary and official residence of the king of Morocco in Rabat. Its official name is El Mechouar Essaid, .

History
The Alaouite sultans and kings have maintained a palace in Rabat since the 18th-century reign of sultan Mohammed ben Abdallah, who used Rabat as one of his imperial residences and renovated royal palaces in other cities. The current building was built in 1864 by Mohammed IV to replace the older palace.

When most of Morocco came under French control in 1912, the colonial administration wanted the sultan to be largely stationed in one place, near their own administrative headquarters, in order to show his acceptance of the new regime. Although kings had many residences at their disposal, when independence was declared in 1955, they chose to keep the Dar al-Makhzen palace as the main palace of the monarch.

Some monarchs, particularly Mohammed V, preferred the smaller and relatively secluded palace of Dar es-Salaam, further out of centre of the city, maintaining the Dar al-Makhzen as their official and administrative residence.

Several important events in the lives of a number of Moroccan royals have taken place in the palace, including the birth of Hassan II in 1929 and the marriage ceremony of Mohammed VI and Salma Bennani in 2002.

Design and Construction

The palace sits at the end of the mechouar, a large parade ground also containing a small mosque. The mechouar is used for large public assemblies, such as the return from exile of Mohammed V in 1955.

As well as living space for the king and the royal family, there is accommodation for the Moroccan Royal Guard. The palace complex also contains the Collège Royal, a school for senior members of the royal family, a cookery school, and a ground floor library built to contain the manuscript collection of Hassan II.

There are extensive gardens and grounds surrounding the palace, the design of which was influenced by French formality, traditional Arabic motifs and local horticulture.

See also
 List of Moroccan royal residences
 List of official residences

References

1860s architecture
1912 establishments in Morocco
Palaces in Morocco
Royal residences in Morocco
Buildings and structures in Rabat
'Alawi architecture
20th-century architecture in Morocco